Cosmetic palette in the form of a Nile tortoise is Naqada culture Pre-Dynastic Egyptian antiquity, made of schist, dating to the 4th millennium BC and now in the collection of the Musée des Beaux-Arts de Lyon. It is a cosmetic palette in the shape of a Trionyx soft-shell turtle from the River Nile.

See also
 Zoomorphic palette
 Fish cosmetic palette

Sources
Jean-Claude Goyon, L'Égypte antique : à travers la collection de l'institut d'égyptologie Victor-Loret de Lyon, Paris - Lyon, Somogy - musée des Beaux-Arts de Lyon, 2007, 120 p..

Antiquities of the Museum of Fine Arts of Lyon
Archaeological discoveries in Egypt